Multiplicity is a philosophical concept developed by Edmund Husserl and Henri Bergson from Riemann's description of the mathematical concept. In his essay The Idea of Duration, Bergson discusses multiplicity in light of the notion of unity. Whereas a unity refers to a given thing in as far as it is a whole, multiplicity refers to the "parts [of the unity] which can be considered separately." Bergson distinguishes two kinds of multiplicity: one form of multiplicity refers to parts which are quantitative, distinct, and countable, and the other form of multiplicity refers to parts that are qualitative, which interpenetrate, and which each can give rise to qualitatively different perception of the whole.

Multiplicity in Gilles Deleuze's philosophy 
Multiplicity forms an important part of the philosophy of Gilles Deleuze, particularly in his collaboration with Félix Guattari, Capitalism and Schizophrenia (1972–80). In his Foucault (1986), Deleuze describes Michel Foucault's The Archaeology of Knowledge (1969) as "the most decisive step yet taken in the theory-practice of multiplicities."

Deleuze argues in his commentary Bergsonism (1966) that the notion of multiplicity forms a central part of Bergson's critique of philosophical negativity and the dialectical method. The theory of multiplicities, he explains, must be distinguished from traditional philosophical problems of "the One and the Multiple." By opposing "the One and the Multiple," dialectical philosophy claims "to reconstruct the real," but this claim is false, Bergson argues, since it "involves abstract concepts that are much too general."

Instead of referring to "the Multiple in general", Bergson's theory of multiplicities distinguishes between two types of multiplicity: continuous multiplicities and discrete multiplicities (a distinction that he developed from Riemann). The features of this distinction may be tabulated as follows:

See also 

 Contextualism
 Perspectivism
 Rhizome (philosophy)

References

Sources

 Bergson, Henri. 2002. Henri Bergson. Key Writings. Edited by Keith Ansell Pearson and John Mullarkey. New York and London: Continuum. 
 Deleuze, Gilles. 1966. Bergsonism. Trans. Hugh Tomlinson and Barbara Habberjam. NY: Zone, 1991. .
 ---. 1986. Foucault. Trans. Sean Hand. London: Althone, 1988. .
 Deleuze, Gilles and Félix Guattari. 1972. Anti-Œdipus. Trans. Robert Hurley, Mark Seem and Helen R. Lane. London and New York: Continuum, 2004. Vol. 1 of Capitalism and Schizophrenia. 2 vols. 1972-1980. Trans. of L'Anti-Oedipe. Paris: Les Editions de Minuit. .
 ---. 1980. A Thousand Plateaus. Trans. Brian Massumi. London and New York: Continuum, 2004. Vol. 2 of Capitalism and Schizophrenia. 2 vols. 1972-1980. Trans. of Mille Plateaux. Paris: Les Editions de Minuit. .
 Foucault, Michel. 1969. The Archaeology of Knowledge. Trans. A. M. Sheridan Smith. London and New York: Routledge, 2002. .
 Massumi, Brian. 1992. A User's Guide to Capitalism and Schizophrenia: Deviations from Deleuze and Guattari. Swerve editions. Cambridge, USA and London: MIT. .
 Nicholas Tampio, ["Multiplicity"] "Sage Encyclopedia of Political Theory" (2010).

Ontology
Continental philosophy
Félix Guattari
Gilles Deleuze